Hajo Wandschneider (December 21, 1925 in Hamburg - March 25, 2017 in Hamburg) was a German defense lawyer.

Biography
Wandschneider was son of the defense attorney Erich Wandschneider, defended u. a. Conrad Ahlers in the Spiegel affair and the RAF (Red Army Faction) terrorist, Susanne Albrecht. He also defended the choirmaster and composer Erich Bender  the orthopedist Rupprecht Bernbeck in court.

Career
Wandschneider was a member of the German section of Amnesty International and a founding member of the Hamburg section.

References

Amnesty International people
1925 births
2017 deaths